EMPA or Empa may refer to:

 Swiss Federal Laboratories for Materials Science and Technology (German: Eidgenössische Materialprüfungs- und Forschungsanstalt)
 European Master of Public Administration Consortium
 EMPA (drug)
 Electron micro probe analyzer (EMPA)
 Euro-Mediterranean Parliamentary Assembly

Geography
 Empa, Cyprus, a community of Cyprus